Noguera is a Spanish surname. Notable people with the surname include:

Alberto Noguera (born 1989), Spanish footballer
Amparo Noguera (born 1965), Chilean television and film actress
Antonio Noguera (born 1988), Venezuelan baseball player
Carlos Noguera (1943–2015), Venezuelan writer and psychologist
Elsa Noguera (born 1973), Colombian politician
Fabián Noguera (born 1993), Argentine footballer
Félix Noguera (born 1987), Colombian footballer
Gonzalo Noguera (born 1977), Uruguayan footballer
Gustavo Noguera (born 1987), Paraguayan footballer
Héctor Noguera (born 1937), Chilean television and film actor
José Miguel Noguera (1913 - 1954), Argentine footballer
Jesús Noguera (born 1990), Spanish professional darts player
Jorge Noguera Cotes (born 1963), Colombian politician and convicted criminal
Junior Noguera (born 2002), Paraguayan footballer
Lucas Noguera Paz (born 1993), Argentine rugby union player
Luis Noguera (born 1973), Venezuelan taekwondo practitioner
Mónica Noguera (born 1971), Mexican television personality
Pablo Noguera (born 1990), Paraguayan footballer
Pedro Noguera (born 1959), American sociologist
Pere Noguera (born 1941), Spanish artist

Spanish-language surnames